Emeka Ifejiagwa  (born 30 October 1977) is a Nigerian retired footballer.

Career
Ifejiagwa played for Udoji United, Iwuanyanwo Nationale and Bendel Insurance in Nigeria, for Charlton Athletic and Brighton & Hove Albion in England, for CA Osasuna in Spain, and for VfL Wolfsburg and Waldhof Mannheim in Germany.

After retiring as a player due to injury, Ifejiagwa began to work for Globalsports Advertisement in Barcelona, Spain.

References

External links
 
 
 
 Emeka Ifejiagwa at worldfootball.net

1977 births
Living people
Nigerian footballers
La Liga players
Bundesliga players
2. Bundesliga players
Charlton Athletic F.C. players
Brighton & Hove Albion F.C. players
CA Osasuna players
Heartland F.C. players
VfL Wolfsburg players
SV Waldhof Mannheim players
Nigeria international footballers
Igbo sportspeople
People from Aba, Abia
Bendel Insurance F.C. players
Udoji United F.C. players
Nigerian expatriate footballers
Nigerian expatriate sportspeople in England
Expatriate footballers in England
Nigerian expatriate sportspeople in Spain
Expatriate footballers in Spain
Nigerian expatriate sportspeople in Germany
Expatriate footballers in Germany
English Football League players
Association football defenders